The NEXT Woman of the Year awards were annual awards in New Zealand, conferred by NEXT magazine (published by Are Media), to "celebrate the outstanding achievements of New Zealand women". The awards, generally announced in October, were first held in 2010, and had five categories, Health & Science, Arts & Culture, Sports, Business and Community. By 2019, two further categories had been added: Education, and a Lifetime Achievement Award. From these category winners, a supreme winner, the NEXT Woman of the Year, was selected. When Bauer Media exited magazine publishing in New Zealand in 2020, Next magazine ceased publishing, and the Woman of the Year awards have not been made since.

2019 awards 

2019 winners were announced at an event held at the Cordis Hotel in October 2019.

 Supreme Winner: Diana Sarfati, public health physician and cancer epidemiologist
 Health & Science: Diana Sarfati
 Business & innovation: Helen Robinson, former managing director of Microsoft NZ, and co-founder of feminine hygiene brand Oi (Organic Initiative)
 Arts & Culture: Samantha Scott, founder of Maidment Youth Theatre, now the Massive Theatre Company
 Education: Dianne Daniels, founder of company Digital Wings
 Sport: Neelusha Jennings  , founder of charity "Limitless with Support", which links able-bodied and disabled people.
 Community: Zhiyan Basharati, leader of CVOC (Christchurch Victims' Organising Committee)
 Lifetime Achievement Awards: The Topp Twins, iconic entertainers

2018 awards 

2018 awards were announced on 11 October. The judges included NEXT editor Rachael Russell.

 Supreme Winner: Philippa Howden-Chapman, "for her long-standing crusade for healthy, warm and dry homes in New Zealand".
 Health & Science: Philippa Howden-Chapman
 Lifetime Achievement Award: Diane Foreman, entrepreneur and chief executive of The Emerald Group, "for her work in paving the way for women in business"
 Arts & Culture: Renee Liang, multi-disciplinary artist, community arts activist and part-time paediatrician
 Education: Rachel Williamson, for establishing the Summer Learning Journey programme to help students at low-decile schools
 Sport: Sarah Leberman, sports researcher and co-founder of Women in Sports Aotearoa
 Business & Innovation: Sharndre Kushor, co-founder of university admissions consulting company Crimson Education
 Community: Merenia Donne, founder of Kotuku Foundation Assistance Animals Aotearoa

2017 awards 

2017 awards were announced on 11 October. 

 Supreme Winner: Kristine Bartlett, advocate for women in the aged-care sector

 Arts & Culture: Carla Van Zon, arts director
 Business & innovation: Ranjna Patel, co-founder and director of Nirvana Health Group and Gandhi Nivas
 Health & Science: Melanie Cheung, neurobiologist fighting degenerative brain disease
 Sport: Heather Te Au-Skipworth, creator of the Iron Māori event, the world's only indigenous half IronMan
 Education: Dame Wendy Pye, creator of a publishing empire
 Lifetime achievement award: Theresa Gattung

2016 winners 

The 2016 winners were announced on 14 October 2016. The judges were Sarah Henry, NEXT Editorial Director, Louise Upston, Minister for Women, CEO of Xero Rod Drury, and television presenter Toni Street.

 Supreme Winner: Billie Jordan – founder of The Hip Op-eration Crew, which is officially recognised as the world’s oldest dance crew
 Arts & Culture: Billie Jordan
 Business & innovation: Victoria Ransom, Wildfire Interactive
 Health & Science: Merryn Gott, nursing academic
 Sport: Trina Tamati, Tournament CEO of the Auckland NRL Nines
 Education: Anne Gaze, founder of tutoring programme Campus Link 
Community: Dale Nirvani Pfeifer, creator of GoodWorld, a company that enables instant charitable donations via social media

2015 awards 
The 2015 awards were announced on 9 October. The judges were Minister for Women Louise Upston, Geoff Ross, Chairman of Trilogy International and CEO of Moa Brewing Company, and NEXT editor Sarah Henry.

 Supreme Winne: Claudia Batten, entrepreneur
 Business & Innovation: Claudia Batten
 Arts & Culture: Fiona Samuel, screenwriter and director
 Community: Ruth Money, advocate for victims and survivors
 Health & Science: Catherine Mohr, engineer and vice-president of strategy, Intuitive Surgery
 Sport: Marcia Petley, Masters athlete
 Education: Frances Valintine, founder of The Mind Lab by Unitec

2014 awards 
The 2014 awards were announced on 10 October. Besides NEXT Magazine editor Sarah Henry, the judging panel was made up of previous winners of the awards, Julie Chapman, Julie Bartlett, Lesley Elliott and Emma Parry.

 Supreme Winner: Sita Selupe, founder and principal of Rise UP Academy and CEO of Rise UP Trust
 Education: Sita Selupe

 Community: Joy Clark, longest serving volunteer of the Grandparents scheme at Starship children’s hospital

 Health & Science: Sally Merry, child psychology research at the University of Auckland
 Sport: Lisa Carrington, Olympic gold-medallist in flatwater canoeing
 Arts & Culture: Miranda Harcourt – actor, playwright and acting coach
 Business: Cecilia Robinson – founder of My Food Bag and Au Pair Link

2013 awards 

The 2013 awards announced on 13 October. They were judged by Martin Snedden, Sarah Henry, Theresa Gattung and Julie Bartlett.

 Supreme Winner: Julie Chapman, founder and CEO of charity KidsCan
 Community: Julie Chapman
 Health and Science: Bronwen Connor, brain researcher
 Sport: Suzie Bates, cricketer
 Education: Julie King, national co-ordinator of the Click SpecialED Trust
 Arts and Culture: Hinewehi Mohi, singer-songwriter, TV producer, and founder of Raukatauri Music Therapy Centre
 Business: Lindy Nelson – executive director of the Agri-Women’s Development Trust

2012 awards 
The 2012 awards were held on 11 October.

 Supreme Winne: Julie Bartlett, founder of StarJam
 Education: Chris Brough, lecturer at University of Waikato

2011 awards 

The 2011 awards were announced on 6 October. The judging panel was NEXT editor Sarah Henry, Dame Catherine Tizard, and Gareth Morgan.

 Supreme Winner: Lesley Elliott, founder of the Sophie Elliott Foundation
 Arts & Culture: Jill Marshall, author and publisher
 Business: Mai Chen, lawyer
 Health & Science: Sue Johnson, Christchurch coroner
 Sport: Jayne Parsons, Paralympian 
 Community: Lesley Elliott

2010 awards 
The first awards were announced on 12 August 2010. The Supreme Winner was Emma Parry for her work on access to high risk maternity services.

 Supreme Winner: Emma Parry
 Community: Alison Browning, teacher

References 

New Zealand awards
Women in New Zealand
2010 establishments in New Zealand
2019 disestablishments in New Zealand